Linda Day (August 12, 1938 – October 23, 2009) was an American television director, working primarily in situation comedies.

Day was born as Linda Gail Brickner in Los Angeles, the daughter of Roy Brickner, a film editor. At the age of 67, she married her childhood sweetheart, L. Steve Varnum, in Texas.

Career
Day started as a script supervisor on the Television film Victory at Entebbe, and on the soap opera parody Soap. She became an associate director for WKRP in Cincinnati in 1978, and began directing episodes of the show in 1980. Linda Day went on to direct a number of successful sitcoms in the 1980s and '90s, including the pilot of Married With Children and 32 more episodes of the show. Day also directed four episodes of the soap opera Dallas during what would become the show's "dream season" in 1985–86, when the events of the entire season were explained away as being a character's dream.

In addition to a Primetime Emmy Award for Outstanding Directing for a Comedy Series nomination, she received a Humanitas Prize and was honored by the Directors Guild of America for paving the way for women in television; she directed more than 350 episodes and 50 series.

Filmography
Good Morning, Miami (2003)
The Parkers (1999)
Working (1997)
Sabrina, the Teenage Witch (1996)
Clueless (1996)
Boston Common (1996)
The Single Guy (1995)
Simon (1995)
The Crew (1995)
The Parent 'Hood (1995)
Unhappily Ever After (1995)
The 5 Mrs. Buchanans (1994)
Models Inc. (1994)
The Nanny (1993)
Thea (1993)
Mad About You (1992)
Top of the Heap (1991)
Major Dad (1989)
Married... with Children (1987)
Throb (1986)
Small Wonder (1985)
It's Your Move (1984)
Who's the Boss? (1984)
Kate & Allie (1984)
After George (1983)
St. Elsewhere (1982)
Gimme a Break! (1981)
Knots Landing (1979)
Archie Bunker's Place (1979)
Benson (1979)
Diff'rent Strokes (1978)
WKRP in Cincinnati (1978)
Dallas (1978)
Soap (1977)
Alice (1976)
Bonanza (1968)
Insight (1960)

References

External links

1938 births
2009 deaths
American television directors
Deaths from cancer in Texas
Deaths from breast cancer
Deaths from leukemia
American women television directors
People from Greater Los Angeles
People from Georgetown, Texas